Marsicano is a surname. It may refer to:

Alberto Marsicano (1952–2013), Brazilian musician, translator, writer, philosopher and professor
Michael Marsicano (born 1956), American entrepreneur, President and CEO of Foundation For The Carolinas
Nicholas Marsicano (1908–1991), American painter and university teacher 
Trevor Marsicano (born 1989), American speed skater and Olympian
Claudia Marsicano (born 1992),Italian actress